Ognica  (German Stolzenhagen) is a village in the administrative district of Gmina Dobrzany, within Stargard County, West Pomeranian Voivodeship, in north-western Poland.

The village has a population of 200.

References

Ognica